Deep Sea Chanteys and Whaling Ballads are two albums recorded then combined for release as a 1941 album by the Almanac Singers.  The lineup of the group at the time was Millard Lampell, Lee Hays, Woody Guthrie and Pete Seeger.  The group received a $250 advance for both albums and bought a Buick for a cross-country tour.

Track listing

References 

Almanac Singers albums
1941 albums
Albums produced by Alan Lomax
Sea shanties albums
Covers albums